Lindmark is a surname. Notable people with the surname include:

Charlotte Lindmark (1819–1858), dancer
Edmund Lindmark (1894–1968), Swedish gymnast and diver
 Erik Lindmark, band member of Deeds of Flesh
Peter Lindmark (born 1956), Swedish ice hockey player
Britta Lindmark, figure skater